In control theory, and especially stability theory, a stability criterion establishes when a system is stable.  A number of stability criteria are in common use:

Circle criterion
Jury stability criterion
Liénard–Chipart criterion
Nyquist stability criterion
Routh–Hurwitz stability criterion
Vakhitov–Kolokolov stability criterion
Barkhausen stability criterion

Stability may also be determined by means of root locus analysis.

Although the concept of stability is general, there are several narrower definitions through which it may be assessed:

 BIBO stability
 Linear stability
 Lyapunov stability
 Orbital stability

Stability theory